This article is about the particular significance of the year 1918 to Wales and its people.

Incumbents

Archdruid of the National Eisteddfod of Wales – Dyfed
Lord Lieutenant of Anglesey – Sir Richard Henry Williams-Bulkeley, 12th Baronet  
Lord Lieutenant of Brecknockshire – Joseph Bailey, 2nd Baron Glanusk
Lord Lieutenant of Caernarvonshire – John Ernest Greaves
Lord Lieutenant of Cardiganshire – Herbert Davies-Evans
Lord Lieutenant of Carmarthenshire – John Hinds
Lord Lieutenant of Denbighshire – Lloyd Tyrell-Kenyon, 4th Baron Kenyon (from 24 January)  
Lord Lieutenant of Flintshire – Henry Gladstone, later Baron Gladstone
Lord Lieutenant of Glamorgan – Robert Windsor-Clive, 1st Earl of Plymouth
Lord Lieutenant of Merionethshire – Sir Osmond Williams, 1st Baronet
Lord Lieutenant of Monmouthshire – Ivor Herbert, 1st Baron Treowen
Lord Lieutenant of Montgomeryshire – Sir Herbert Williams-Wynn, 7th Baronet 
Lord Lieutenant of Pembrokeshire – John Philipps, 1st Viscount St Davids 
Lord Lieutenant of Radnorshire – Powlett Milbank (until 30 January); Arthur Walsh, 3rd Baron Ormathwaite (from 5 April)
Bishop of Bangor – Watkin Williams 
Bishop of Llandaff – Joshua Pritchard Hughes
Bishop of St Asaph – A. G. Edwards (later Archbishop of Wales) 
Bishop of St Davids – John Owen

Events
January – Coalowner, Liberal politician and Minister of Food Control David Alfred Thomas is created Viscount Rhondda; following his death on 3 July the title passes by special remainder to his daughter, the suffragette Margaret Mackworth.
26 January – An Irish steamship, the Cork, is torpedoed by a U-boat off Point Lynas in Anglesey. Twelve crew are killed.
29 January – The steamship Ethelinda is torpedoed by a U-boat off the Skerries. Twenty-six crew are killed.
4 February – The steamship Treveal is torpedoed by a U-boat off the Skerries. Thirty-three people are killed.
5 February – The steamship Mexico City is torpedoed by a U-boat off South Stack, Holyhead. Twenty-nine crew are killed.
March
Miners' leader A. J. Cook is imprisoned for sedition under the Defence of the Realm Act 1914 for his public opposition to the war.
2 March – The British submarine  is rammed and sunk, having been mistaken for a U-boat, off Porthdinllaen. All twenty-six crew are killed.
7 March – The steamship Kenmare is torpedoed by a U-boat off the Skerries. Twenty-six crew are killed.
7 April – The steamship Boscastle is torpedoed by a U-boat off Strumble Head. Eighteen crew are killed.
21 April – The steamship Landonia is torpedoed by a U-boat off Strumble Head. Twenty-one crew are killed.
9 May – The steamships Baron Ailsa and Wileysike are torpedoed by a U-boat off Pembrokeshire. Fourteen crew are killed.
19 May – The German U-boat SM UB-119 is sunk, perhaps off Bardsey Island.
15 June – The steamship Strathnairn is torpedoed by a U-boat off Bishops and Clerks, Pembrokeshire. Twenty-one crew are killed.
22 August – The steamship Palmella is torpedoed by a U-boat off South Stack, Holyhead. Twenty-eight people are killed.
16 September – The steamship Serula is torpedoed by a U-boat off Strumble Head. Seventeen crew are killed.
18 September – The 38th (Welsh) Division is involved in the Battle of Epéhy.
Autumn – Edward Thomas John (Liberal MP for East Denbighshire) defects to the Labour Party.
10 October – Three seamen are killed while returning to their ship by boat at Milford Haven.
14 October – The steamship Dundalk is torpedoed by a U-boat off the Skerries. Twenty-one crew are killed.
11 November – Armistice Day. Able Seaman Richard Morgan, serving aboard , is the last Welshman – and perhaps the last Briton – to be killed on active service in the First World War, in the course of which over 40,000 Welsh people have lost their lives.
15 November – The British submarine  is launched at Pembroke Dock.
14 December – United Kingdom general election:
For the first time, a woman stands as a parliamentary candidate in Wales: Millicent Mackenzie stands unsuccessfully for the University of Wales, itself a new parliamentary seat (which is won by Herbert Lewis).
Home Rule for Wales is included as a policy in the manifesto of the Labour Party.
William Brace becomes Labour MP for Abertillery.
Alfred Onions becomes Labour MP for Caerphilly.
John Hugh Edwards becomes Liberal MP for Neath, his previous constituency of Mid Glamorganshire having been abolished.
Sir Robert Thomas, 1st Baronet, becomes Liberal MP for Wrexham.
David Sanders Davies becomes Liberal MP for Denbigh, standing against Edward Thomas John.
December – The beginning of the 1918 flu pandemic which lasts into the following year and kills about 10,000 people in Wales.

Arts and literature
John Morris-Jones is knighted for his services to literature.
August is fixed as the annual month of the National Eisteddfod of Wales.

Awards

National Eisteddfod of Wales (held in Neath)
National Eisteddfod of Wales: Chair – John Thomas Job
National Eisteddfod of Wales: Crown – D. Emrys Lewis

New books
W. H. Davies – A Poet's Pilgrimage
David Delta Evans – The Rosicrucian
Moelona – Rhamant y Rhos

Music
Walford Davies is appointed director of music to the Royal Air Force.

Film
The Life Story of David Lloyd George (drama, not shown publicly until 1996)

Sport
Baseball – First records of the Grange Gasworks Ladies team playing in Cardiff.

Births
15 January – Billy Lucas, international footballer (died 1998)
7 May – Robert Davies, politician (died 1967)
9 May – Sir Kyffin Williams, artist (died 2006)
20 May – David Ormsby-Gore, 5th Baron Harlech (died 1985)
6 June – Susan Williams-Ellis, founder of Portmeirion Pottery (died 2007)
4 July – Tony Garrett, chairman of Imperial Tobacco (died 2017)
19 August – Dilys Elwyn Edwards, composer (died 2012)
19 September – Penelope Mortimer, writer (died 1999)
26 September – John Rankine, author (died 2013)
3 November – Glyn Williams, international footballer (died 2011)

Deaths
30 January – Powlett Milbank, Lord Lieutenant of Radnorshire, 65
15 February – William Evans, judge, c.71
13 April
David Ffrangcon Davies, baritone, 62
Thomas Tannatt Pryce, VC recipient, 32 (killed in action)
3 July – David Alfred Thomas, 1st Viscount Rhondda, industrialist and politician, 62
13 September – Samuel Thomas Evans, MP, 59
21 September – Emily Charlotte Talbot, heiress, 78 
27 September – Morfydd Llwyn Owen, composer, pianist and mezzo-soprano, 26 (medical complications)
15 October – William David Phillips, Wales international rugby player, 63
4 November – Wilfred Owen, poet from the Welsh borders, 25 (killed in action)
25 November – William Griffith, mining engineer who worked with Cecil Rhodes, 65 
1 December
John Griffiths, artist, 81
Fred Perrett, Wales international rugby union player, 27 (died of wounds received in action)

References

 
Wales